Colin James is the debut album by Canadian rock/blues musician Colin James, released in 1988. The album featured several hit singles, including "Five Long Years", "Voodoo Thing", "Chicks 'n Cars (And the Third World War)" and Why'd You Lie".

The album earned James a Juno Award for "Most Promising Artist".

Commercial performance
James' debut album was the 15th best-selling Cancon album in Canada of 1989. The album was certified Double Platinum in Canada in 1994. By May 1998, the album had sold 276,338 units in Canada. It is the best-selling album of James' career to date.

Track listing
 "Five Long Years"                          – 4:36
 "Voodoo Thing"                             – 3:38
 "Down in the Bottom" (Willie Dixon)    – 4:37
 "Chicks 'n Cars (And the Third World War)" (Johnny Ferreira, Rick Hopkins, Colin James, Darrell Mayes) – 3:35
 "Why'd You Lie" (Morgan Davis)         – 5:25
 "Hidden Charms" (Willie Dixon)             – 3:26
 "Bad Girl" (Rick Hopkins, Colin James, Dennis Marcenko) – 3:34
 "Lone Wolf"                                – 3:40
 "Dream of Satin"                           – 4:43
 "Three Sheets to the Wind" (Rick Hopkins)  – 2:59

Personnel 
Colin James – guitar, vocals, background vocals
Steve Croes – keyboards
Richard Hopkins – piano, keyboards, Hammond organ
Bill Payne – piano
David Burgin – harmonica
Johnny Ferreira – tenor and soprano saxophones
Dennis Marcenko – bass
Darrell Mayes – percussion, drums
Betty Wright – background vocals
Bill Cowsill – background vocals

Production 
Tom Dowd – producer
Danny Kortchmar – producer, mixing
Bob Rock – producer
Mike Fraser – engineer
Shep Lonsdale – engineer
Simon Pressey – engineer
Duane Seykora – engineer, assistant engineer
Charles Die – assistant engineer
Neil Dorfsman – mixing
Greg Fulginiti – mastering
Dan Hersch – mastering
Brian Lynch – photography
Melanie Nissen – design
Jeffrey Kent Ayeroff – art direction
Alberto Tolot – photography

References

External links 
 Colin James

Colin James albums
1988 debut albums
Albums produced by Tom Dowd
albums produced by Danny Kortchmar
albums produced by Bob Rock
Virgin Records albums